Labeo macmahoni is fish in genus Labeo from the drainage of the River Dasht in Pakistan.

Etymology
The fishes name sake is not identified; but probably is in honor of the British diplomat and Indian Army officer Arthur Henry McMahon (1862-1949), who was responsible in asking Zugmayer to establish a collection of marine fishes for a national museum in Quetta, Pakistan

References

Talwar, P.K. and A.G. Jhingran, 1991. Inland fishes of India and adjacent countries. vol 1. A.A. Balkema, Rotterdam. 541 p.

Labeo
Taxa named by Erich Zugmayer
Fish described in 1912